Alexandria Public Schools is a school district headquartered in Alexandria, Minnesota.

In addition to Alexandria, it serves the cities of Carlos, Forada, Garfield, Miltona, and Nelson; and the townships of Alexandria, Belle River, Brandon, Carlos, Holmes City, Hudson, Ida, LaGrand, Lake Mary, Leaf Valley, Miltona, Moe, Osakis, and Spruce Hill. It also serves Reno Township in Pope County.

Schools
 Secondary
 Alexandria Area High School
 Discovery Middle School
 Primary
 Carlos Elementary School
 Garfield Elementary School
 Lincoln Elementary School
 Voyager Elementary School
 Woodland Elementary School
 Miltona Science Magnet
 Preschool
 Early Education Center

References

External links
 Alexandria Public Schools

School districts in Minnesota
Education in Douglas County, Minnesota
Education in Pope County, Minnesota